Aphrophora alni, the European alder spittle bug, is a species belonging to the family Aphrophoridae.

Distribution
This species is quite common and widespread. It is present in most of Europe, in the eastern Palearctic realm, in the Near East, and in North Africa. It is naturalized in North America.

Habitat

Description

The adults of these large 'froghoppers' reach  of length, the females are usually slightly larger than the males. The basic coloration of the body is usually brown. Their front wings wear two distinct clear patches on the margins. Head and pronotum have a median keel. The head has a pair of compound eyes and two simple eyes (ocelli). The legs are strongly developed and fit to jump. Tibiae of the rear pair of legs carry several spines.

Biology
They can be encountered from May through October on bushes and on several species of trees, especially willows (Salix species), birch (Betula species), alder (Alnus species) and poplar (Populus species).). Aphrophora alni is a polyphagous species, meaning it feeds on several kind of plants. The adults primarily feed on deciduous trees, while larvae prefer herbaceous plants (dicotyledonous).

To lay eggs, the females migrate to the herb layers. The eggs overwinter and hatch the larvae in the following spring. The larvae live in stems and leaves of herbaceous plants inside the typical foam nest, that protects them against enemies and provide necessary moisture and temperature for their development. Aphrophora alni has only one generation a year.

Gallery

References

External links
 Biolib
  Aphrophora
 ITIS Report
 Soulier-Perkins, A. (2013) Cercopoidea Organised On Line.

Aphrophoridae
Insects described in 1805
Hemiptera of Europe
Articles containing video clips